Premyer-Ministr (lit. Prime minister) is a Russian musical group. The idea behind the band was to form a boy band, though not especially for teenagers. Four men came together to form Premier Ministr in 1997. Their first real success came in 2000 with the remake of a very popular Russian tune, "Oriental Song". It became a huge hit in Russia.

In 2001 one of the members, Dmitry Lanskoy, left the group for a solo career and was replaced. Premyer-Ministr was composed of Jean Grigoriev-Milimerov (Moscow, December 5, 1979), Peter Jason (Moscow, September 9, 1976), Vyacheslav Bodolika (Ungeny, Moldova, June 18, 1977) and Marat Chanyshev (Moscow, March 25, 1975).

In 2002, Russian television invited the group to participate in the Eurovision Song Contest in Tallinn. They translated their name into "Prime Minister", and sung "Northern Girl", which reached the top-10. There were two videos made for "Northern Girl", the English and Russian versions, called "Девочка c севера" (Girl From The North).

In 2005, the group members split with their producer and started independent career as Group PM, while Premier Ministr was started anew with Taras Demchuk, Sergey Demyanchuk, Amarkhuu Borkhuu, and Vasily Kireyev.

References

External links
Official website 

Russian boy bands
Eurovision Song Contest entrants for Russia
Eurovision Song Contest entrants of 2002
Russian pop music groups
Musical groups established in 1997
Winners of the Golden Gramophone Award